Several Canadian naval units have been named HMCS Cowichan;

 , a Bangor-class minesweeper commissioned in 1941 and sold in 1946.
 , a Bay-class minesweeper commissioned in 1953 and sold to France in 1954.
 , a Bay-class minesweeper commissioned in 1957 and decommissioned in 1997.

Battle honours

 Atlantic, 1941–45
 Normandy, 1944
 English Channel, 1944–45

References

 Government of Canada Ships' Histories - HMCS Cowichan

Royal Canadian Navy ship names